The (Old) Orangeburg County Jail, also known as The Pink Palace, is a historic jail located at Orangeburg, Orangeburg County, South Carolina. It was built between 1857 and 1860, and is a two-story, rectangular, cement-covered brick building in the Late Gothic Revival style.  It features a crenellated main tower and corner turrets.  General William Tecumseh Sherman’s troops burned the building in February 1865; it was subsequently restored.

It was added to the National Register of Historic Places in 1973.

Orangeburg County inmates are now kept in the Orangeburg-Calhoun Regional Detention Center.

References

Jails on the National Register of Historic Places in South Carolina
Gothic Revival architecture in South Carolina
Government buildings completed in 1860
Buildings and structures in Orangeburg County, South Carolina
National Register of Historic Places in Orangeburg County, South Carolina
Jails in South Carolina